Squeeze is an English new wave band from London. Formed in March 1974, the group originally consisted of guitarists and vocalists Glenn Tilbrook and Chris Difford, bassist Harri Kakoulli, keyboardist Jools Holland and drummer Paul Gunn. The group's current lineup features Tilbrook and Difford, drummer Simon Hanson, keyboardist Stephen Large (both of whom joined in 2007), percussionist Steve Smith (since 2017), steel guitarist Melvin Duffy (since 2019) and bassist Owen Biddle (since 2020).

History

1974–1982
Glenn Tilbrook and Chris Difford formed Squeeze in March 1974, later completing the lineup with the additions of bassist Harri Kakoulli, keyboardist Jools Holland and drummer Paul Gunn. In 1976, Gunn was replaced by Gilson Lavis, who had previously toured with artists including Chuck Berry, Dolly Parton and Jerry Lee Lewis. The band released their first EP Packet of Three in 1977, followed by their self-titled full-length debut the next year. Shortly after the release of the group's second album Cool for Cats in April 1979, Kakoulli was replaced by John Bentley. The new lineup released the single "Christmas Day" later in the year, followed by their third album Argybargy in early 1980. During the subsequent promotional tour, Holland left in August 1980 to start a solo career.

Holland was replaced by Paul Carrack, formerly of Roxy Music, although his appointment was not announced until early 1981. By September that year, after the release and promotion of East Side Story, the keyboardist had left again to join Carlene Carter's backing band. He was replaced a couple of months later by Sinceros keyboardist Don Snow. The new lineup issued Sweets from a Stranger and the single "Annie Get Your Gun" in 1982, before disbanding at the end of the year. The breakup was attributed to Tilbrook and Difford being "Tired of touring and [the band's] frustrating commercial fortunes".

1985–1999
In January 1985, the Argybargy lineup of Squeeze (with Jools Holland returning) reunited for a one-off performance. Tilbrook and Difford subsequently chose to reform the group officially, with Keith Wilkinson taking Bentley's place on bass. After the release of Cosi Fan Tutti Frutti, Holland's brother Christopher joined as a second keyboardist on tour, but was replaced shortly thereafter by Andy Metcalfe. In the summer of 1987, he was made an official member in time for the release of Babylon and On. Metcalfe had left by 1988, with his place taken by Matt Irving. Eighth album Frank was released in 1989.

After a run of shows ending in January 1990, Holland left Squeeze for a second time. The 1991 release Play was subsequently credited to Tilbrook, Difford, Wilkinson and Lavis as a four-piece. For the ensuing concert tour, keyboards were performed by former member Don Snow and new addition Carol Isaacs. By the summer of 1992, Lavis had been replaced by Pete Thomas of the Attractions, while his bandmate Steve Nieve (who contributed to Play) took over on keyboards. Former keyboardist Paul Carrack returned to take over from Nieve in early 1993. In September, the group released their tenth studio album Some Fantastic Place, for which they toured until the end of the year.

For a Japanese tour in early 1994, Carrack (who was touring with Mike and the Mechanics) was temporarily replaced by former keyboardist Andy Metcalfe. In the summer, Squeeze toured the US with Aimee Mann as an additional vocalist and guitarist. The group performed without a drummer after Thomas had joined the reunited Attractions, with returning keyboardist Carrack contributing some percussion. For a string of UK shows later in the year, Andy Newmark joined on drums. In early 1995, Kevin Wilkinson took over for the recording of Ridiculous, while Don Snow rejoined for a third time on the subsequent touring cycle. After a short hiatus, the group returned in 1998 with a lineup including bassist Hilaire Penda, keyboardist Christopher Holland (brother of Jools) and drummer Ash Soan.

During the tour in promotion of new studio album Domino, co-founder Chris Difford left Squeeze in early 1999 due to ongoing problems with alcohol abuse, with the band continuing for the rest of the year as a quartet. For select dates, support act Nick Harper appeared as a second guitarist and vocalist, and for the final few shows of the tour Holland was replaced by Chris Braide. After the tour concluded in November, Squeeze disbanded and Tilbrook and Difford continued working on separate projects.

Since 2007
After eight years apart (save for sporadic collaborations), Glenn Tilbrook and Chris Difford reformed Squeeze in early 2007. The rest of the lineup was completed with former bassist John Bentley and new members Stephen Large on keyboards and Simon Hanson on drums. During a UK tour in late 2010, Large was temporarily replaced by Steve Nieve. The group issued two live albums and Spot the Difference, comprising new recordings of old songs, between 2007 and 2012. Personnel remained stable until July 2015, when Bentley left the band by "mutual decision". He was replaced by Lucy Shaw, who completed recording for Cradle to the Grave.

After the release and promotion of their eleventh studio album, Squeeze announced in July 2017 that Shaw had been replaced by Yolanda Charles, and that Steve Smith had joined on percussion, guitar and vocals. Both new members debuted on The Knowledge that year. The group became a seven-piece for the first time in August 2019, when steel guitarist Melvin Duffy – who had performed with the band for several years as a backup member – joined officially. Sean Hurley replaced Charles in February 2020, who was followed by Owen Biddle in April.

Members

Current

Former

Touring

Timeline

Lineups

References

External links
Squeeze official website

Squeeze